GDRT May Refer to

GDRT,  King of the Kingdom of Aksum (c. 200)
Gauteng Department of Roads and Transport, Government road agency in South Africa

See also
 Gadara (disambiguation)